John Vincent Koronka (born July 3, 1980) is an American former professional baseball pitcher, who played in Major League Baseball (MLB) for the Chicago Cubs, Texas Rangers, and Florida Marlins. He also played in Nippon Professional Baseball (NPB) for the Orix Buffaloes.

Playing career

Cincinnati Reds
Koronka was selected by the Cincinnati Reds in the 12th round of the 1998 MLB Draft. While playing in the Reds farm system with the Stockton Ports in 2002, he was named to the California League All-Star team. On December 16, 2002, he was selected by the Texas Rangers in the Rule 5 Draft but did not make the Rangers opening day roster and was returned to the Reds on March 21, 2003.

Chicago Cubs
Koronka was traded by the Reds to the Chicago Cubs on August 26, 2003, for Phil Norton. He made his major league debut for the Cubs on June 1,  against the Los Angeles Dodgers and gave up 3 runs over 5 innings, walked 3, and struck out 5 for the win.

Texas Rangers
On March 31, 2006, Koronka was traded to the Texas Rangers for Freddie Bynum, whom the Rangers had just acquired from the Oakland Athletics. Koronka started 23 games for the Rangers in 2006, going 7–7 with a 5.69 ERA. He was optioned to the Triple-A Oklahoma RedHawks prior to the start of the 2007 season.

Koronka made two starts in 2007 for the Rangers going 0–2 with a 7.84 ERA.

Cleveland Indians
He was designated for assignment on July 1, 2007, and subsequently claimed off outright waivers on July 9, 2007, by the Cleveland Indians. He was assigned to their Triple-A team, the Buffalo Bisons. With the Bisons, he made 9 starts and went 3–3 with a 3.54 ERA.

On September 1, 2007, he was designated for assignment and outrighted to the minor leagues on September 12. Koronka opted for minor league free agency on November 3, 2007.

Colorado Rockies/Orix Buffaloes
On December 21, 2007, the Colorado Rockies signed Koronka to a minor league contract with an invitation to spring training. He was 5–3 in 13 appearances (12 starts) for the Colorado Springs Sky Sox. On June 23, the Rockies released Koronka so he could sign with a Japanese team, the Orix Buffaloes. He started 3 games for the Buffaloes, finishing 0–1 with a 6.75 E.R.A..

Florida Marlins
On January 13, Koronka signed a minor league deal with the Florida Marlins. He started two games for the Marlins (0-2, 11.75 E.R.A.) and spent most of the season with the New Orleans Zephyrs.  He was granted free agency on October 8, .

Los Angeles Dodgers
On January 28, 2010, Koronka signed a minor league contract with the Los Angeles Dodgers with an invite to spring training. He began 2010 with the Chattanooga Lookouts in the Double-A Southern League. After seven starts with the Lookouts he was promoted to the AAA Albuquerque Isotopes. He made one start with the Isotopes, allowing eight runs in 1 innings. He was released on June 2.

Lancaster Barnstormers
On July 26, 2010, Koronka signed a contract with the Lancaster Barnstormers of the Independent Atlantic League. He was released on August 3, 2010. He was re-signed on March 8, 2011.

Post-playing career
Koronka worked for the Chicago Cubs as a regional scout in charge of Florida from 2011 to 2020.

In March 2021, Koronka was hired as an assistant coach for the Embry–Riddle Eagles baseball program.

References

External links

1980 births
Living people
Major League Baseball pitchers
Baseball players from Florida
Chicago Cubs players
Texas Rangers players
Florida Marlins players
Billings Mustangs players
Gulf Coast Reds players
Clinton LumberKings players
Dayton Dragons players
Mudville Nine players
Chattanooga Lookouts players
Stockton Ports players
West Tennessee Diamond Jaxx players
Iowa Cubs players
Oklahoma RedHawks players
Buffalo Bisons (minor league) players
Colorado Springs Sky Sox players
Orix Buffaloes players
New Orleans Zephyrs players
Albuquerque Isotopes players
American expatriate baseball players in Japan
Lancaster Barnstormers players
Southern Maryland Blue Crabs players
Embry–Riddle Eagles baseball coaches
Chicago Cubs scouts